Planctogystia lemur is a moth of the family Cossidae. It is found in eastern Madagascar.

The holotype had been found in Ifanadiana in 1995.

See also
 List of moths of Madagascar

References
 Yakovlev, R. V. 2009. New taxa of African and Asian Cossidae (Lepidoptera) - Euroasian Entomological Journal 8(3):353–361, plate 4.

External links
 insecta-web.org: Picture of the holotype

Cossinae
Moths described in 2009
Moths of Madagascar
Moths of Africa